Pennahia anea, commonly known as the bigeye croaker, is a species of fish native to the Indian region.

References

Fish of Thailand
Fish described in 1793
Fish of the Indian Ocean
Sciaenidae